Shangolabad (also Romanized as Shangolābād and Shengelābād; also known as Shangool Abadé Arvanagh and Shingilabad) is a village in Guney-ye Markazi Rural District, in the Central District of Shabestar County, East Azerbaijan Province, Iran. At the 2006 census, its population was 426, in 124 families.

References 

Populated places in Shabestar County